Anja Longyka (born 21 June 1993) is a Slovenian professional racing cyclist. She rode for the UCI Women's Team  during the 2019 women's road cycling season.

References

External links

1993 births
Living people
Slovenian female cyclists
Place of birth missing (living people)